Orr's Hill Vivekananda College is a provincial school in Trincomalee, Sri Lanka.

See also
 List of schools in Eastern Province, Sri Lanka

References

1978 establishments in Sri Lanka
Educational institutions established in 1978
Provincial schools in Sri Lanka
Schools in Trincomalee